Cesamorelosia is a genus of flies in the family Tachinidae.

Species
Cesamorelosia bonasus (Reinhard, 1964)

Distribution
Mexico.

References

Diptera of North America
Dexiinae
Tachinidae genera
Monotypic Brachycera genera